Andrews is a town in Dallas Township, Huntington County, Indiana, United States. The population was 1,048 at the 2020 census.

History
Andrews was originally called Antioch, and under the latter name was platted in 1853. It was renamed Andrews in the 1880s, in honor of a railroad official, at the time when the railroad was built through the community.

Geography
Andrews is located at  (40.860824, -85.600960).

Demographics

2010 census
As of the census of 2010, there were 1,149 people, 435 households, and 302 families living in the town. The racial makeup of the town was 96.3% White, 0.3% African American, 1.0% Native American, 0.3% Asian, 0.1% from other races, and 1.8% from two or more races. Hispanic or Latino of any race were 1.9% of the population.

There were 435 households, of which 38.2% had children under the age of 18 living with them, 51.3% were married couples living together, 12.2% had a female householder with no husband present, 6.0% had a male householder with no wife present, and 30.6% were non-families. 24.8% of all households were made up of individuals, and 10.4% had someone living alone who was 65 years of age or older. The average household size was 2.64 and the average family size was 3.10.

The median age in the town was 36.4 years. 27.7% of residents were under the age of 18; 9.1% were between the ages of 18 and 24; 24.7% were from 25 to 44; 26.2% were from 45 to 64; and 12.3% were 65 years of age or older. The gender makeup of the town was 51.1% male and 48.9% female.

2000 census
As of the census of 2000, there were 1,290 people, 470 households, and 351 families living in the town. The racial makeup of the town was 97.05% White, 0.08% African American, 1.09% Native American, 0.16% Asian, 0.08% from other races, and 1.55% from two or more races. Hispanic or Latino of any race were 2.17% of the population.

There were 470 households, out of which 37.7% had children under the age of 18 living with them, 57.7% were married couples living together, 11.3% had a female householder with no husband present, and 25.3% were non-families. 20.0% of all households were made up of individuals, and 7.4% had someone living alone who was 65 years of age or older. The average household size was 2.74 and the average family size was 3.16.

In the town, the population was spread out, with 31.0% under the age of 18, 7.0% from 18 to 24, 31.5% from 25 to 44, 19.1% from 45 to 64, and 11.5% who were 65 years of age or older. The median age was 33 years. For every 100 females, there were 102.8 males. For every 100 females age 18 and over, there were 98.7 males.

The median income for a household in the town was $35,125, and the median income for a family was $36,150. Males had a median income of $30,580 versus $19,891 for females. The per capita income for the town was $15,198. About 6.2% of families and 8.2% of the population were below the poverty line, including 9.0% of those under age 18 and 9.4% of those age 65 or over.

Education
The town has a lending library, the Andrews-Dallas Township Public Library.

References

External links
 

Towns in Indiana
Towns in Huntington County, Indiana